Lithuanian Archery Federation is a national governing body of archery sport in Lithuania.

Federation also organising annual national Lithuanian Archery Championships.

Structure 
As of 2020:
 President: Gediminas Maksimavičius
 General Secretary: Laura Urvakytė-Stankevičienė

References

External links 
Official website

Badminton
1965 establishments in Lithuania
Sports organizations established in 1965
National members of the European and Mediterranean Archery Union
Archery in Lithuania